Very Live at Buddy's Place is a jazz septet album by drummer Buddy Rich recorded in 1974 and released on the Groove Merchant Records label.

Track listing 
LP side A
"Chameleon" (Herbie Hancock) – 4:52
"Jumpin' at the Woodside" (Count Basie, Jon Hendricks) – 7:20
"Sierra Lonely" (Manny Albam) – 6:21
LP side B
"Cardin Blue" (Rich) – 9:51
"Nica's Dream" (Horace Silver) – 6:38
"Billie's Bounce" (Charlie Parker) – 6:00

Personnel 
 Buddy Rich] – drums
 Anthony Jackson – bass
 Kenny Barron – piano
 Michael Abene – piano
 Jack Wilkins – guitar
 Jimmy Maelen – conga
 Sonny Fortune – alto saxophone, flute
 Sal Nistico – tenor saxophone

References 

Groove Merchant GM 3301 (1974 LP)
LRC Records 24104 (2004 CD)

1974 live albums
Buddy Rich live albums
Groove Merchant live albums
Albums produced by Sonny Lester